The United Nations Programme on Reducing Emissions from Deforestation and Forest Degradation (or UN-REDD Programme) is a collaborative programme of the Food and Agriculture Organization of the United Nations (FAO), the United Nations Development Programme (UNDP) and the United Nations Environment Programme (UNEP), created in 2008 in response to the UNFCCC decisions on the Bali Action Plan and REDD at COP-13. It should not be confused with REDD+, a voluntary climate change mitigation approach that has been developed by Parties to the UNFCCC (see below #Difference between REDD+ and the UN-REDD Programme).

The overall development goal of the Programme is "to reduce forest emissions and enhance carbon stocks in forests while contributing to national sustainable development". The UN-REDD Programme supports nationally led REDD+ processes and promotes the informed and meaningful involvement of all stakeholders, including indigenous peoples and other forest-dependent communities, in national and international REDD+ implementation.

The Programme has expanded steadily since its establishment and now has over 60 official Partner Countries spanning Africa, Asia-Pacific and Latin America-Caribbean.

In addition to the UN-REDD Programme, other initiatives assisting countries that are engaged in REDD+ include the World Bank’s Forest Carbon Partnership Facility, Norway’s International Climate and Forest Initiative, the Global Environment Facility, Australia’s International Forest Carbon Initiative, the Collaborative Partnership on Forests, and the Green Climate Fund.

The UN-REDD Programme publicly releases each year an Annual Programme Progress Report and a Semi-Annual Report.

Support to Partner Countries 

The UN-REDD Programme supports its Partner Countries through:
 Direct funding and technical support to the design and implementation of National REDD+ Programmes;
 Complementary tailored funding and technical support to national REDD+ actions; and
 Technical country capacity enhancing support through sharing of expertise, common approaches, analyses, methodologies, tools, data, best practices and facilitated South-South knowledge sharing.

Governance 
The UN-REDD Programme's 2016-2020 governance arrangements allow for the full and effective participation of all UN-REDD Programme stakeholders – partner countries, donors, indigenous peoples, civil society organizations, participating UN agencies – while ensuring streamlined decision-making processes and clear lines of accountability.

The governance arrangements are built on and informed by five principles: inclusiveness, transparency, accountability, consensus-based decisions and participation.

UN-REDD Programme 2016-2020 governance arrangements include:

Executive Board  

The UN-REDD Programme Executive Board  has general oversight for the Programme, taking decisions on the allocation of the UN-REDD Programme fund resources. It meets bi-annually, or more frequently as required to efficiently carry out its roles and responsibilities.

Assembly 

The UN-REDD Programme Assembly is a broad multi-stakeholder forum with the role to foster consultation, dialogue and knowledge exchange among UN-REDD Programme stakeholders.

National Steering Committees 

National Steering Committees facilitate strong country ownership and shared/common decision-making for National REDD+ Programmes, and include representatives of civil society and indigenous peoples. Each National Steering Committee provides oversight for National Programmes, addressing any delays, changes or reorientation of a programme and ensuring alignment with and delivery of results as expected and approved by the Executive Board.

Multi-Party Trust Fund Office 

The Multi-Party Trust Fund Office provides real-time funding administration to the UN-REDD Programme.

2016-2020 Strategic Framework 
The work of the UN-REDD Programme is guided by its 2016-2020 Strategic Framework, with the goal to: Reduce forest emissions and enhance carbon stocks in forests while contributing to national sustainable development.

In order to realize its goal and target impacts, the Programme has set three outcomes and supporting outputs for its 2016-2020 work programme:
 Contributions of REDD+ to the mitigation of climate change as well as to the provision of additional benefits have been designed.
 Country contributions to the mitigation of climate change though REDD+ are measured, reported and verified and necessary institutional arrangements are in place.
 REDD+ contributions to the mitigation of climate change are implemented and safeguarded with policies and measures that constitute results-based actions, including the development of appropriate and effective institutional arrangements.
Additionally, the Programme has identified four important cross-cutting themes as being particularly significant in order to ensure that the outcomes and outputs of the Programme will achieve results as desired: Stakeholder Engagement, Forest Governance, Tenure Security and Gender Equality.

Donors 
The UN-REDD Programme depends entirely on voluntary funds. Donors to the UN-REDD Programme have included the European Commission and governments of  Denmark, Japan, Luxembourg, Norway, Spain and Switzerland—with Norway providing a significant portion of the funds.

Transparency 
The UN-REDD Programme adheres to the belief that information is fundamental to the effective participation of all stakeholders, including the public, in the advancement of REDD+ efforts around the world. Information sharing promotes transparency and accountability and enables public participation in REDD+ activities.

The collaborating UN agencies of the UN-REDD Programme –  FAO, UNEP and UNDP – are committed to making information about the Programme and its operations available to the public in the interest of transparency.  As part of this commitment, the Programme publishes annual and semi-annual programme progress reports and provides online public access to real-time funding administration.

Difference between REDD+ and the UN-REDD Programme 
REDD+ is a voluntary climate change mitigation approach that has been developed by Parties to the UNFCCC. It aims to incentivize developing countries to reduce emissions from deforestation and forest degradation, conserve forest carbon stocks, sustainably manage forests and enhance forest carbon stocks.

The United Nations Collaborative Programme on Reducing Emissions from Deforestation and Forest Degradation in Developing Countries – or UN-REDD Programme – is a multilateral body. It partners with developing countries to support them in establishing the technical capacities needed to implement REDD+ and meet UNFCCC requirements for REDD+ results-based payments. It does so through a country-based approach that provides advisory and technical support services tailored to national circumstances and needs. The UN-REDD Programme is a collaborative programme of the United Nations Food and Agriculture Organization (FAO), the United Nations Development Programme (UNDP) and the United Nations Environment Programme (UNEP), and harnesses the technical expertise of these UN agencies. Other examples of REDD+ multilaterals include the Forest Carbon Partnership Facility and Forest Investment Program, hosted by The World Bank.

See also 

 Voluntary Partnership Agreements
 REDD+
 United Nations Environment Programme

References

External links 
Official UN-REDD Programme Website
Official UN-REDD Programme Online Collaborative Workspace
Official UNFCCC Website
UN-REDD Programme Multi-Partner Trust Fund Factsheet

Partners:
Forest Carbon Partnership Facility (FCPF)
Global Environment Facility (GEF)
Forest Investment Program (FIP)

Carbon finance
Food and Agriculture Organization
Forest certification
International forestry organizations
United Nations Development Programme
United Nations Environment Programme
United Nations Framework Convention on Climate Change
World forestry